Gezahegne is both a given name and a surname. Notable people with the name include:

Kalkidan Gezahegne (born 1991), Ethiopian middle distance runner
Gezahegne Abera (born 1978), Ethiopian long-distance runner

Amharic-language names